Karen Anne Gren Scholer (born December 2, 1957) is an American lawyer who serves as a United States district judge of the United States District Court for the Northern District of Texas.

Biography 

Scholer received a Bachelor of Arts degree in 1979 from Rice University. She received a Juris Doctor in 1982 from Cornell Law School. She started her legal career as an associate at the law firm of Strasburger & Price, LLP, where she was employed from 1982 to 1996. She was elevated to partner in 1989. From 1996 to 2000, she was a partner at the law firm of Andrews Kurth.

In 2000, Scholer was elected as a Republican to be a State District Judge for the 95th Judicial District Court of Dallas County, Texas She was re-elected without opposition in 2004, serving in this position until 2008. In 2007, she also served as the presiding judge for the Dallas County Civil District Judges. From 2009 to 2013, she was a partner at the law firm of Jones Day. From 2014 to 2018, Scholer was a principal in the law firm of Carter Scholer Arnett Hamada & Mockler, PLLC, where she specialized in business litigation, complex tort litigation, and alternative dispute resolution. She was promoted to a co-managing partner in 2015.

Federal judicial service

Expired nomination to Eastern District of Texas under Obama 

On March 15, 2016, President Barack Obama agreed with U.S. Senators John Cornyn and Ted Cruz to nominate Scholer to serve as a United States district judge of the United States District Court for the Eastern District of Texas, to the seat vacated by Judge Richard A. Schell, who assumed senior status on March 10, 2015. On September 7, 2016, a hearing before the Senate Judiciary Committee was held on her nomination. Her nomination generated no controversy, but the Senate had a large backlog of nominees and bills. Her nomination expired on January 3, 2017, with the end of the 114th Congress.

Nomination to Northern District of Texas under Trump 

On September 7, 2017, Scholer was renominated to a district court by President Donald Trump. However, she was nominated to serve as a United States district judge of the United States District Court for the Northern District of Texas, to the seat vacated by Judge Jorge Antonio Solis, who retired on May 1, 2016. On October 26, 2017, her nomination was reported out of committee by a voice vote. On March 1, 2018, the Senate invoked cloture on her nomination by a 96–1 vote. On March 5, her nomination was confirmed by a 95–0 vote. She received her commission on March 6, 2018, and was sworn into office on March 7, 2018.

Electoral history 
2000

2004

See also 
 Barack Obama judicial appointment controversies
 List of Asian American jurists
 List of first women lawyers and judges in Texas

References

External links 
 

1957 births
Living people
20th-century American women lawyers
20th-century American lawyers
21st-century American women judges
21st-century American judges
21st-century American women lawyers
21st-century American lawyers
American jurists of Asian descent
Cornell Law School alumni
Judges of the United States District Court for the Northern District of Texas
People from Tokyo
Rice University alumni
Texas lawyers
Texas Republicans
Texas state court judges
United States district court judges appointed by Donald Trump